Mahlwinkel is a village and a former municipality in the Börde district in Saxony-Anhalt, Germany. Since 1 January 2010, it is part of the municipality Angern.

Paintball
Mahlwinkel is the home of the biggame series, one of Europe's biggest paintball tournaments. The former Russian army base is used as a huge playfield. About 2,000 players from all over the world visit Mahlwinkel twice a year.

Former municipalities in Saxony-Anhalt
Börde (district)